Silver and Gold may refer to:

Chemistry 
Electrum, also called white gold, is gold that has silver added to it.

Music Group 
 Silver & Gold cello and piano duo in CT that plays beautiful music for weddings and other special occasions.

Music 
 Silver & Gold (Vanessa Williams album), also featuring the song by Burl Ives
 Silver & Gold (Neil Young album), also title song
 Silver & Gold (Sufjan Stevens album)
 "Silver and Gold" (Dolly Parton song)
 "Silver and Gold", song from the Sun City album by Artists United Against Apartheid, also recorded by U2
 "Silver and Gold", Christmas song by Burl Ives from the Rudolph the Red-Nosed Reindeer soundtrack
 Silver and Gold, album and song by ASAP
 "Silver and Gold", single by T-Pain

Television 
 Silver and Gold (TV series), a 2017 Japanese TV series

Video games
 Pokémon Silver and Gold, two 1999 video games

See also
Gold and Silver, 1934 Mexican film
Oro y plata (disambiguation)